Talorg (also Talorc, Talorgan and Talorcan) may refer to:

 Talorc m. Achiuir, First known King of Picts
 Talorc I of the Picts, Talorc son of Aniel
 Talorc II of the Picts, Talorc son of Muircholach 
 Talorc III of the Picts, Talorc son of Foith, died 653
 Talorcan of the Picts, Talorcan son of Eanfrith of Bernicia, died 657
 Talorgan II of the Picts, Talorgan son of Óengus, died 782
 Talorgan son of Fergus, brother of Óengus I of the Picts, killed 750
 Talorcan son of Drestan, king of Atholl and brother of Nechtan IV of the Picts
 Talorc V of the Picts (died 837), or Talorcan son of Wthoil, a king of the Picts